Ouzera District is a district of Médéa Province, Algeria.

The district is further divided into 4 municipalities:
Ouzera
Tizi Mahdi
El Hamdania
Benchicao

Districts of Médéa Province